Onome Akinbode-James (born March 9, 2000) is a Nigerian basketball player. She represented Nigeria in the FIBA Africa Under-16 Championship for Women. She plays college basketball for the Duke Blue Devils women's basketball team.

Early life
Onome was (born on March 9, 2000) in Abeokuta, Ogun State, South western Nigeria. She had her primary Education in Abeokuta. She was in her secondary school in Nigeria when she started playing basketball at the age of 14. She transferred to Blair Academy in Blairstown, New Jersey, where she completed her high school education.

High school career
Onome was recruited into Blair Academy after the FIBA Africa Under-16 Championship for Women. In her senior year she averaged 13.0 points, 11.8 rebounds, and 2.2 blocks per game.

Onome gave a TED Talk at her high school Blair Academy during her senior year there. The talk is titled Africa, Country or Continent: The Broken Perception.

College career
Onome was recruited into the Duke Blue Devils by former Duke head coach Joanne P. McCallie. In her freshman season, she averaged 4 point and 5.7 rebounds per game.

National Team career
Onome represented Nigeria in the FIBA Africa Under-16 Championship for Women where she averaged 5.7 points, 10.3 rebounds and 0.8 assists per game during the tournament.
The Nigerian team won the silver medal after a 57–46 loss to Mali in the Final, thereby qualifying them to the World U-17 Championship for Women. Nigeria did not participate in the tournament.

References

2000 births
Living people
Blair Academy alumni
Nigerian women's basketball players
Centers (basketball)
Forwards (basketball)
Duke Blue Devils women's basketball players
Nigerian expatriate basketball people in the United States
Basketball players from New Jersey
Sportspeople from Abeokuta
21st-century Nigerian women